"Supersymmetry" is episode 5 of season 4 in the television show Angel. Written by Elizabeth Craft and Sarah Fain and directed by Bill L. Norton, it was originally broadcast on November 3, 2002, on the WB network.

Plot
Fred's article on superstring theory is published in an academic journal, and she is asked to present it at a physics symposium by her old college professor Seidel. Her presentation is interrupted when a dimensional portal opens and snake-like creatures emerge to kill her.

Gunn and Angel suspect another member of the audience, a comic book fanatic who seemed to be expecting the portal's appearance, but it turns out he's just following stories of strange disappearances and reading about Angel on internet forums.

Fred learns that Professor Seidel is the one responsible and that he was the one who sent Fred into the Pylea dimension six years earlier. He felt Fred and other missing colleagues were competing for his job. Against Angel and Gunn's advice, Fred pursues vengeance against her former mentor. She asks for Wesley's help. When she is almost sucked into a portal opened by a text message from Seidel, Wesley agrees to help.

Meanwhile, Cordelia is staying with Connor at his vast empty loft. He trains her to slay vampires while romance blossoms.

Angel confronts Seidel (largely to protect him from Fred's vengeance), but Seidel releases a demon from a portal to attack Angel. Seidel tries to escape, but he encounters Fred. She opens her own portal, intending to send him to a hell dimension as punishment. As he is being sucked in, Gunn arrives. When he is unable to convince Fred to close the portal, Gunn snaps Seidel's neck and throws him into the portal. Fred and Gunn lie to Angel that Seidel fell victim to his own portal meant for Fred.

Connor arrives at the Hyperion Hotel to pick up Cordelia's things because they have decided to live together. Connor and Cordelia battle a common vampire. Elated when she stakes it, Cordelia impulsively kisses Connor.  Connor embraces her, but Cordelia is uncomfortable and pulls away.  She explains that she still doesn't know who she is or where she belongs.  Connor angrily realizes that she's going back to Angel.

Cordelia arrives at the hotel to talk to Angel.  She tells him that she is the same person she was before her amnesia, and that person doesn't need protecting.  After Angel promises not to lie to her anymore, she asks him if they were in love.

Production details

Arc significance
 This episode begins the breakup of Fred and Gunn's relationship, and indicates Connor's growing affection for Cordelia as the two share a kiss.
 In addition, Wesley and Lilah's complicated relationship is further developed, as she brings him a gift and realizes that he is still attracted to Fred.
 Angel demonstrates that he has photographic memory when he re-creates the auditorium environment with chairs and is able to recall exactly where every lecture attendee was seated and how each one responded to the portal.
 Despite the story originally suggesting it was simply a coincidence that Fred came upon the book, it's revealed that Fred's college professor Seidel was responsible for her being sent to Pylea, as well as several other students. A later episode, "Inside Out," implies Seidel himself was manipulated by the demon Skip as part of a long-term plan to assemble the members of Angel Investigations.

Cultural references
 The Incredible Hulk: After Angel threatens Lilah she responds with "Yeah, yeah, 'Hulk smash'" a common phrase from the Hulk comic books.
 Daredevil, Elektra, and Bullseye: During the scene with comic book reader, Jared, Gunn references Bullseye killing Elektra in Daredevil #181.
 Dark Horse Comics: During the same scene, Jared is wearing a Thwack! shirt, the comic book fan says, "we're kinda crushing the Dark Horses" when Gunn is pushing him up against the comic book rack, on which Dark Horse comics such as Usagi Yojimbo are visible. Angel is reading from a Ghost comic, which is published by Dark Horse. Dark Horse had published the first series of Angel comics and currently publishes the Buffy Season 8 series.
 The girl, the cat and the peanut butter: A reference to a well-known urban myth, although the myth usually involves a dog, not a cat.
 Chicago Cubs: Fred mentions former Cubs stars Sammy Sosa and Nomar Garciaparra, although when the episode originally aired, Garciaparra was still with the Boston Red Sox.
Fred complains that people want her to be "all sweetness and light". This is an allusion to P.G. Wodehouse's Uncle Fred's stories.

Reception
UGO Networks calls this episode "one of the more interesting looks at murderous intent to come along in a while."

References

External links

 

Angel (season 4) episodes
2002 American television episodes